QSD may refer to:

 Q_code, "Is my keying defective?" / "Are my signals mutilated?"
 Quality spread differential, a concept in finance
 Quadrilateral Security Dialogue, a strategic dialogue
 Quick Step–Davitamon, UCI cycling team (2003–04)
 Syrian Democratic Forces